Woodberry Forest School is a private, all-male boarding school located in Woodberry Forest, Madison County, Virginia, in the United States. Woodberry's current enrollment is 405. Students come from 28 U.S. states (plus the District of Columbia), and 28 countries.

History

The school was founded in 1889 by Captain Robert Stringfellow Walker, who had been a member of the 43rd Battalion Virginia Cavalry (Mosby's Rangers) during the American Civil War. The campus is bounded on one side by the Rapidan River. It was originally the estate of William Madison, brother of President James Madison. The headmaster's residence, known as The Residence, is taken entirely from an architectural design by Thomas Jefferson. It was listed on the National Register of Historic Places in 1979. The property eventually passed to the Walker family. The school was founded when Walker hired a tutor to teach his six sons and other local children because of the lack of adequate schooling in the surrounding area. Today the campus is known for its historic Jeffersonian brick buildings as well as state of the art science and arts facilities.

J. Carter Walker, son of Captain Walker, and a graduate of the school, graduated from the University of Virginia in 1897. According to Elizabeth Copeland Norfleet in A Venture in Faith, a history of the school's early years, his plans to go on to law school were interrupted by his father's request that he serve as "head teacher." Carter Walker later explained his decision to his brother thus, "I always did what Father and Mother told me to."

Headmasters
J. Carter Walker served as headmaster from 1898 for a tenure of 50 years until he retired in 1948. Headmasters since then have been:
Shaun Kelley, Jr. (1948–1952)
Joseph M. Mercer (1952–1961)
A. Baker Duncan Jr. (1961–1970)
Charles W. Sheerin, Jr. (1970–1973)
Gerald L. Cooper (acting) (1973–1974)
Emmett W. Wright, Jr. (1974–1991)
John S. Grinalds (1991–1997)
Dennis M. Campbell (1997–2014)
Byron C. Hulsey (2014–present)

Honor System and Prefect Board

A principal feature of life at Woodberry is its student-run honor system. A Prefect Board of roughly 18 senior students decide the fate of any students who "lie, cheat, or steal", and making a recommendation to the headmaster. The Prefect Board may recommend an honor warning, honor probation, or honor dismissal. Anyone found violating the honor code severely is dismissed from the school. The Prefect Board is determined through a process involving students, faculty, and administration. In the spring trimester, an election among the students is held where students are given a roster of the rising senior class and asked to select the 18 they feel are best suited to the role. Faculty undertake a similar process, and later the administration interviews the individual candidates as determined by the initial elections. Finally, the headmaster decides the final composition of the board and they are announced publicly to the student body before the close of the year.

Aside from maintaining the honor system, the Prefect Board is charged with guiding the new students though orientation. Prefects also serve in roles similar to that of resident assistants, organizing dormitory events and informing students of news and events. A Senior Prefect is elected by the Prefect Board from among its members; his role is similar to that of a student body president, giving a speech at the assembly commencing the school year and at graduation in spring.

Athletics

Woodberry, nicknamed the Tigers, competes in the Virginia Prep League in a variety of sports including basketball, soccer, baseball, golf, swimming, lacrosse, wrestling, cross country, tennis, track, and football.

The longest-running high school football rivalry in the South takes place each year between Woodberry Forest and Episcopal High School of Alexandria, Virginia. The schools first played against each other in 1901 and have competed in over a hundred games. "The Game," as it is known, draws back many alumni and is considered the homecoming game for both schools. The 100th contest, which Woodberry won, took place in 2000, and drew nearly 15,000 spectators.  Before every game between the two schools, Woodberry has a bonfire reaching heights of four stories where students line up to throw torches into a tower of logs. The bonfire draws nearly as many Woodberry fans as The Game itself.

The school's facilities include an on-campus 9-hole golf course designed by Donald Ross, an indoor track/pool complex, two turf football/lacrosse fields, two baseball fields, three competition-level soccer fields, and three other grass fields for football, soccer, or lacrosse.

The Tigers send numerous players to play college football at all levels, including multiple NCAA Division I recruits each year.

Notable alumni  
Notable alumni of Woodberry Forest School include:
 Donald Antrim, novelist and MacArthur Fellow
 William Johnston Armfield IV, business executive and philanthropist
 Marvin P. Bush, Class of 1975, youngest son of George H. W. Bush and brother of George W. Bush
 Richard Thurmond Chatham, Congressman from North Carolina
 Martin Clark, author and Virginia circuit court judge
 Jack Cobb, standout basketball player for the University of North Carolina during the 1920s
 Charles W. Coker, former chairman/CEO of Sonoco Products
 Bosley Crowther, film critic for The New York Times
 Robert Daniel, five-term Congressman from Virginia
 Edward D. Dart, FAIA. Renowned Modernist architect
 Charles B. Dew, Class of 1954, Civil War historian
 Robert H. Edmunds, Jr., Associate Justice of North Carolina Supreme Court
 Thomas B. Evans, Jr., three-term Congressman from Delaware
 Kendall Gaskins, NFL running back
 Gordon Gray, National Security Advisor
 Arthur B. Hancock, Jr., Thoroughbred racehorse owner and breeder
 John Wesley Hanes II, investment banker who served as Under Secretary of the United States Treasury and President of the New York Racing Association
 Burr Harrison, Congressman from Virginia
 Sacha Killeya-Jones (born 1998), American-British basketball player for Hapoel Gilboa Galil of the Israeli Basketball Premier League
 David Ho, founder of Harmony Airways
 Paul Ilyinsky, former mayor of Palm Beach
 William States Lee III, former chairman/CEO of Duke Power
 Julius Curtis Lewis, Jr., former Mayor of Savannah, GA
 Paul C. P. McIlhenny, CEO of McIlhenny Co., producers of "Tabasco sauce"
 Alex McMillan, five-term Congressman from North Carolina
 James McMurtry, singer-songwriter
 Johnny Mercer, songwriter
 Halsey Minor, CNET Networks founder
 Rogers Morton, former United States Secretary of the Interior, United States Secretary of Commerce and Congressman from Maryland
 Thruston Morton, U.S. Congressman and Senator from Kentucky
 Beto O'Rourke, Class of 1991, former U.S. Congressman from the Texas 16th Congressional District
 Heinz Pagels, Class of 1956, particle physicist and executive director of the New York Academy of Sciences
 Noel Perrin, essayist and professor at Dartmouth College 
 Earl Norfleet Phillips, Ambassador of the United States to Barbados, Dominica, St Lucia, Antigua, St. Vincent, and St. Christopher-Nevis-Anguilla
 Rufus Phillips, journalist, politician, and businessman 
 L. Richardson Preyer, former jurist and six-term Congressman from North Carolina
 CJ Prosise, class of 2012, NFL running back for the Seattle Seahawks
 Ed Reynolds, American football safety in the National Football League
 J. Sargeant Reynolds, executive vice president of Reynolds Aluminum Credit Corp., Virginia House of Delegates, Senate of Virginia, Lieutenant Governor of Virginia
 James D. Robinson III, former CEO of American Express
 William Fitts Ryan, Class of 1940, Congressman from New York
 Randolph Scott, actor
 Todd G. Sears, class of 1994, businessman and advocate for LGBT equality
 Dick Spangler, billionaire, former President of the University of North Carolina
 Will Strickler, class of 2004, professional golfer on PGA Tour
 W. Elliott Walden class of 1981, President and CEO of racing operations for WinStar Farm
 Angus Wall, class of 1984, Oscar-winning film editor
 Roger Wilson, Class of 1975, actor in Porky's
 Frank Wisner, OSS/CIA official
 Frank G. Wisner, former Under Secretary of Defense for Policy and Under Secretary of State for International Security Affairs, and former ambassador to India
 J. Craig Wright, Class of 1947, former justice of the Ohio Supreme Court

References

External links 
 Woodberry Forest School website

Boarding schools in Virginia
Private high schools in Virginia
Educational institutions established in 1889
Schools in Madison County, Virginia
1889 establishments in Virginia
Boys' schools in the United States